This is a list of attacks by the National Socialist Underground (NSU), a far-right terrorist group that existed in Germany.

See also 
 National Socialist Underground
 List of right-wing terrorist attacks

References 

Attacks in Germany
National Socialist Underground